Rapid CRP may refer to:
A quick test of C-reactive protein
Procalcitonin, also a marker of inflammation, and its rise can be detected sooner after onset